Madjid Bouguerra (born January 8, 1949, in Oum El-Bouaghi, Algeria) is an Algerian diplomat.  As ambassador to the United States, he presented his credentials to President Barack Obama on February 13, 2015.

He has had several ambassadorial posts: Zambia (1987-1990), Niger (1992-1997), China (2001-2005) and Germany (2010-2013).

In 2007, he was named secretary general of the Ministry of Foreign Affairs.

Bouguerra attended the National School of Administration (class of 1973) before studying economics at the University of Algiers, graduating from there in 1974.

In September 2021, Abdelmadjid Tebboune announced to replace Madjid Bouguerra with Ahmed Boutache as new ambassador to the US.

References

1949 births
People from Oum El Bouaghi Province
Ambassadors of Algeria to the United States
Ambassadors of Algeria to Germany
Ambassadors of Algeria to Niger
Ambassadors of Algeria to China
Ambassadors of Algeria to Zambia
Living people
21st-century Algerian people